Mercadante is a surname. Notable people with the surname include:

Aloízio Mercadante (born 1954), Brazilian economist and politician
Saverio Mercadante (1795–1870), Italian opera composer